The yellow-tailed oriole (Icterus mesomelas) is a passerine bird in the New World family Icteridae. It breeds from southern Mexico to western Peru and northwestern Venezuela; in Peru it also lives in a river valley corridor.

It is mainly yellow with a black back, lower face and upper breast. The wings are black with yellow epaulets. The tail, seen from above, is black with yellow margins; from below, it appears almost entirely yellow. This is the only oriole with prominent yellow in the tail, hence the species’ name. The sexes are similar, but young birds have the black on the back and tail replaced with olive-green.

There are four subspecies:
 I. m. mesomelas – (Wagler, 1829): nominate, found from Mexico to Honduras, has yellow fringes to the tertials
 I. m. salvinii – Cassin, 1867: found in the Caribbean lowlands of Nicaragua and Costa Rica, has no yellow fringes to the tertials and is more orange than the nominate race
 I. m. carrikeri – Todd, 1917: found in Panama, Colombia and northwestern Venezuela, is like salvinii, but less orange and smaller-billed
 I. m. taczanowskiis – Ridgway, 1901: found in Pacific South America from Ecuador to western Peru, has white fringes to the tertials

The calls of this species include a chick and a weechaw. The song is a melodic repetition of rich whistles, chuck, chuck-yeeaow. It is often given as a duet, with the female's response following or overlapping the male's longer phrases.

This large oriole inhabits dense thickets, often with vines,  Heliconias and similar dense growths, in swampy lowlands. The birds forage in pairs or small groups in denser vegetation than most orioles, mainly feeding on insects, although they will also take nectar and certain fruits such as gumbo-limbo (Bursera simaruba).

It lays three dark-blotched white eggs, which hatch in 13 days with a further 14 days to fledging.

The yellow-tailed oriole is fairly common except in Peru and Venezuela, but is reducing in numbers in parts of its range because of persecution by the cage-bird trade; this species is valued for both its appearance and its beautiful song.

References

Further reading

External links

 Yellow-tailed oriole stamps from Ecuador and Mexico at bird-stamps.org
 Yellow-tailed oriole photo (shows yellow tail-feathers), Photo no. 2 – "Panama Birds" gallery by Glen Tepke at pbase.com
 Yellow-tailed oriole species account on the Animal Diversity Web (ADW) of the University of Michigan
 
 
 
 
 
 
 
 

yellow-tailed oriole
Birds of Central America
Birds of the Yucatán Peninsula
Birds of Colombia
Birds of the Tumbes-Chocó-Magdalena
yellow-tailed oriole